Soundwave is a fictional character appearing in various Transformers continuity lines within the Transformers franchises. His most well-known disguise that is of a micro cassette recorder. Throughout most of his incarnations, he is an underlying loyal lieutenant of the Decepticon leader Megatron. He is commonly depicted as Megatron's communications officer and in some interpretations, only speaks when mocking the Autobots.

Transformers: Generation 1
Soundwave is one of the characters from the original Transformers line.  His alternate mode is a microcassette recorder and he has a distinctive monotone, computerized voice.

Soundwave is able to detect and jam transmissions across the entire energy spectrum, a talent that makes him suited to his position as a Deception Communications Officer. Additionally, he has a photographic memory on account of the data storage capacity of the magnetic disks in his chest compartment, and he is armed with a shoulder-mounted laser cannon and hand-held concussion blaster. Soundwave is physically strong compared to most Transformers. His alternative form is that of an Earthly microcassette deck. Within the tape compartment, which becomes his chest in robot mode, he stores a variety of Decepticon spies, all of which take the alternative form of a microcassette. These spy characters include Ravage, Laserbeak, Buzzsaw, Ratbat, Rumble, Frenzy, Slugfest, Wingthing, Autoscout and Overkill, all of whom are under Soundwave's command in the original television series. Squawktalk and Beastbox were additional cassette characters under Soundwave's control within the US toyline, who never appeared in the cartoon.

Soundwave's cassettes are quick to serve and defend Soundwave in a crisis, and generally relate to him as servants or even pets. However, when his cassette Ratbat became leader of the Decepticons in the Marvel Comics series, Soundwave fully shifted his trademark loyalty from Megatron to him. In the Dreamwave comics, Ratbat led the Ultracons faction, while Soundwave remained with the Decepticons led by Shockwave, although within that continuity these events occurred before Ratbat took up a cassette form. In the IDW comics, on pre-war Cybertron Soundwave functioned as personal assistant to Ratbat, who was a Senator at the time, however, Soundwave's true loyalty lay with Megatron. When the time came for him and Starscream to massacre the Senate, he enslaved Ratbat by bestowing the smaller, weaker cassette body upon him.

Reception
According to X-Entertainment, Soundwave was one of the top Transformers figures of all time.

Animated series
In the original Transformers cartoon, Soundwave was Megatron's right-hand mech, frequently sent on important reconnaissance missions with his cassettes, and often playing a key role in many schemes against the Autobots. On Cybertron, he used his ability to transform into a lamp-post to spy on the Autobot city of Lacon, learning of the Autobots' plan to search for energy on other worlds. Soundwave participated in Megatron's assault on the Autobots' spacecraft, the Arc, and met the same fate as the other occupants when the ship crashed on prehistoric Earth, leaving everyone trapped in stasis. After awakening on Earth in 1984, Soundwave played a crucial part in generating energon cubes and devising strategies to construct a new spacecraft for the Decepticons to journey back to Cybertron.

Later, he used his mind-reading talents to acquire an antimatter formula for the Decepticons from the brain of Chip Chase. He and his cassette minions were often on spying missions against the Autobots.

One of Soundwave's most notable misadventures came in season 2 when, operating a plan conceived by Starscream, he brainwashed humans with ultrasonic vibrations, leading to a confrontation with his Autobot Communications Officer counterpart, Blaster, and to a lasting rivalry between the two.

Soundwave rarely displayed much emotion, infrequently exhibiting any traits that could be considered to be in line with his tech spec. However, he showed distress when one of his cassettes were hurt in battle, and he always came across as extremely loyal to Megatron, even going so far as to recover his body after beaten close to death by Optimus Prime at the battle of Autobot City in 2005 (The Transformers: The Movie). But while Soundwave was loyal, he was far from outspoken, and kept silent when Megatron's body was subsequently ejected into space, and although he did suggest himself as a replacement leader ("Soundwave: superior. Constructicons: inferior."), Soundwave again loyally served Megatron when he was reformatted as Galvatron.

In season 3, although operating in a less prominent capacity for most of the time, Soundwave played a prominent role in Galvatron's attempt to learn the secret of a sonic weapon on the planet Eurythma, where sound and music were the way of life, leaving Soundwave entranced by the planet's perfect melodies. Recording each piece of the harmony that formed the devastating sonic effect, Soundwave was defeated when the Eurythmans countered the harmony with white noise, and was again pulled into a confrontation with Blaster, who erased his recordings.

Soundwave made his final appearance in the American cartoon series, the Season 3 finale, The Return of Optimus Prime, Part 1 as he was only seen giving the latest piece of information gathered by Ratbat that two scientists had discovered Optimus Prime's body, a fact which made Galvatron eager to destroy it once and for all. Although Soundwave only appeared as a background character in the American cartoon series finale, the three-part The Rebirth, he returned to the forefront in the new Japanese-exclusive series, Transformers: The Headmasters, which was created to replace The Rebirth. Reborn as Soundblaster (New Soundwave in the English version and Vizar in Italy) Soundwave's new toy incarnation was, like the series, available only in Japan.

In the 1987 anime robot superhero TV series Transformers: The Headmasters, Soundwave and Blaster's rivalry had increased dramatically. In the opening cut and thrust of Headmasters, Soundwave and Blaster engaged in their final clash in the Arctic Circle as the Autobots and Decepticons were in the process of searching for the missing Autobot Matrix of Leadership. The two opponents inflicted fatal damage to each other, and Soundwave's body exploded even as Blaster collapsed. Soundwave's fragments were recovered by his cassettes. Using reconstructive technology from the planet Master, the leader of the Decepticon Headmasters, Zarak successfully rebuilt and resurrected Soundwave and renamed him Soundblaster—essentially identical to his former self, except for his predominantly black color scheme. As Soundblaster, he served the same role as he had as Soundwave under the leadership of Galvatron and later Scorponok, frequently embarking on spying missions with Ratbat. In Headmasters, his character was somewhat changed to have more of a father-son relationship with the cassettes, as it was hinted on his resurrection as Soundblaster.

Soundwave was performed by Frank Welker, whose voice was heavily modulated by a vocoder to achieve Soundwave's distinctive, metallic monotone. However, Welker's voice was left unmodulated at certain points during the episodes "Roll for It" and "Webworld" due to production errors. This left him sounding like Dr. Claw, another role Welker performed, from Inspector Gadget.

Books
Soundwave appeared in the following books:
 The 1984 sticker and story book Return to Cybertron written by Suzanne Weyn and published by Marvel Books. Oddly he was mistakenly depicted as an Autobot.
 The 1985 Find Your Fate Junior book called Dinobots Strike Back by Casey Todd.
 The 1985 Find Your Fate Junior book called Battle Drive by Barbara Siegel and Scott Siegel.
 The 1985 Transformers audio books Autobots' Lightning Strike, Megatron's Fight For Power, Autobots Fight Back, Laserbeak's Fury and Satellite of Doom, as well as Galvatron's Air Attack from the 1986 series.
 The 1985 audio story Sun Raid.
 The 1986 story and coloring book The Lost Treasure of Cybertron by Marvel Books.

Comics

3H Enterprises
Soundwave also appeared in the Furman written Reaching the Omega Point, as one of the Transformers legends (alongside Optimus Prime, Megatron and Grimlock) who came to the aid of the forces of Optimus Primal against the Predacon/Unicron hybrid Shokaract, distracting him long enough for Primus to deal the fatal blow.

Devil's Due Publishing
In Devil's Due's run of G.I. Joe vs. the Transformers comic book miniseries, Soundwave was among the Transformers captured by the ruthless terrorist Cobra Organization, when they discovered the Ark. Refitted by Destro, Soundwave was intended to become a battlefield communications station, but when he and the other Decepticons eventually broke free of their control he was damaged in a battle with the Autobots and his parts were captured by the US Government for study. From his data banks, the android SerpentO.R. downloaded information on the history of Cybertron, using it to further the Decepticon goal of conquest. It is indicated that his pre-Earth form was similar to his Dreamwave's War Within form.

Dreamwave Productions
In Dreamwave's 21st century re-imagining of the Generation 1 continuity, Soundwave was recruited to the Decepticons 9 million years ago through Megatron's underground gladiatorial games, and made head of communications. When a new Autobot leader, Optimus Prime, was chosen, Soundwave was sent along with the Insecticons and Ravage, to attempt to kill him and recover the Autobot Matrix of Leadership for Megatron, but they failed, forcing Megatron to confront Optimus personally.

Even in the face of failures such as this, and later the loss of Megatron in an early space bridge experiment, Soundwave's loyalty to the Decepticon cause never wavered, as he remained true to the faction under Shockwave's leadership.

As in most other continuities, the story continues in the traditional manner, with Soundwave a member of the Nemesis crew who attacked the Ark and was sent into stasis when the craft crashed on Earth, awakening again in 1984. After years of fighting on Earth, eventually the combined forces of the Autobots and their human allies were able to defeat and capture the Decepticons. The intent was for the Autobots to take their enemies back to Cybertron aboard a new craft named the Ark II, but just as the ship cleared the atmosphere, it exploded, the victim of machinations by Shockwave, who did not want Prime and Megatron to return to Cybertron yet.

Soundwave's body crashed back to Earth in the Arctic, where he lay inactive for several years, until rogue military scientist Adam Rook, calling himself "Lazarus," recovered and reactivated him, putting him under his control with a program he had developed while studying the Transformers before their explosive departure. Several other Autobots and Decepticons fell to the same fate, and were to be sold on the black market—Soundwave himself was put on display by being sent to attack the Smitco Oil Refinery alongside several other Transformers—but when Megatron liberated himself, Soundwave was soon freed by his leader and assumed his position at his side.

When Shockwave arranged for the capture and extradition of Prime and Megatron's forces as war criminals, Soundwave was among the captives, but when Starscream jettisoned Megatron into space on the return trip to Cybertron, Soundwave made the best of a bad lot and teamed with Starscream to return to Earth and conquer it, being reunited with Ratbat in the process. Heading back to Earth in a kidnapped Sky Lynx and with the Combaticons now added to their ranks, the Decepticons attacked the Ark in hopes of acquiring parts to make the Nemesis spaceworthy again, however Soundwave, Skywarp and Thundercracker were defeated and thrown in the Arks brig. When the Combaticons, combined as Bruticus, laid into the vessel, they were freed.

It was not much later that the surviving Megatron made contact with Soundwave from space, and Soundwave was all too willing to return to his service, setting up Starscream to fall before Megatron when he returned. And return, Megatron did—but the bankruptcy and subsequent closure of Dreamwave' left the rest of the story untold.

Soundwave also appeared in the Dreamwave' Transformers/G.I. Joe series as one of the Decepticons uncovered by Cobra at the start of the World War II. Transforming into a radio, he was deactivated at the series' close by Grimlock. Although Dreamwave's collapse precluded the completion of the second series, released art and information revealed that Soundwave would have been involved in the conclusion of that series.

Fun Publications
Based on the Transformers Classics toy line, the Timelines 2007 story is set 15 years after the end of the Marvel Comics story (ignoring all events of the Marvel UK and Generation 2 comics). Megatron survived the crash of the Ark on Earth, reformatted himself into a new form and now leads Astrotrain, Laserbeak, Ramjet, Ravage, Skywarp, Soundwave, Starscream and the Constructicons. Optimus Prime has also returned to Earth commanding Bumblebee, Cliffjumper, Grimlock, Jetfire, Mirage and Rodimus (formerly Hot Rod). When the Cybertronians Skyfall and Landquake arrive on Earth unexpectedly Megatron attempts to destroy them, but Optimus Prime and his Autobots are able to drive Megatron away.

Soundwave was among Megatron's troops when Megatron defeated Deathsaurus in combat for leadership of the Decepticons and when Megatron attacked Iacon with his new weapon, Devastator.

IDW Publishing
Soundwave's first chronological appearance in the rebooted IDW Publishing Generation One universe was in the prequel miniseries, The Transformers: Megatron Origin. In the story, Soundwave works for Senator Ratbat, who takes an interest in the rising gladiator, Megatron. Ratbat sends Soundwave to offer weaponry to Megatron and his followers. Soundwave also assists Megatron with the interrogation of Autobot soldier, Bumper. Soundwave is later jailed along with Megatron and others when Sentinel Prime's forces capture them, but is released by Ratbat. When Megatron's plan is sprung, Soundwave helps Starscream massacre the Autobot Senate. He later confronts Ratbat and forcibly extracts his Spark for implantation in one of his Cassette bodies. Soundwave's alternate mode appears to be a communication vehicle with tank treads.

Sometime later, Soundwave was part of the conference of scientists called by Thunderwing in The Transformers: Stormbringer, where he refuses to accept Thunderwing's findings that Cybertron was dying. In around the same time period he had Beachcomber captured and implanted with a cerebro-shell, having the unwilling traitor eject his opposite number Blaster into space (in Spotlight Blaster) in order to demoralize the Autobots prior to a Decepticon offensive.

Soundwave's story was later continued in his own Spotlight one-shot, where he was a self-serving and duplicitous Decepticon internal affairs agent. Soundwave was dispatched by Megatron to keep an eye on Bludgeon's investigation of Shockwave's lab. However, he kept quiet about Bludgeon's obsession with the Regenesis project, thinking he could turn it to his advantage. Following him to Earth in 1984, Soundwave monitored Bludgeon's attempts to harvest Ultra Energon and confronted him after he'd acquired it. Horrified to discover they were not planning to use it in a power-play but instead to reanimate Thunderwing (who previously devastated Cybertron), Soundwave attempted to stop them but was trapped in stasis-lock in cassette player mode. It was revealed in the epilogue that two young humans considered buying him at a pawn shop in 2007.

In The Transformers: Escalation #1, Optimus stated there was evidence that Soundwave had been present in Earth's history. Despite this, he did not reappear until issue #4 of The Transformers: Devastation, where, still trapped in cassette player mode, he interfered with Skywatch's control of Laserbeak and Ravage.

Soundwave also appeared as one of the Decepticon forces, serving under Starscream in the out-of-continuity The Transformers: Evolutions tale "Hearts of Steel". He appeared as one of Starscream's lieutenants. He was presumably destroyed when John Henry and Bumblebee diverted the Decepticon train convoy into a chasm.

Marvel Comics
Like much of the original 1984 cast of Decepticons, Soundwave played a much smaller role in the Marvel book series than he did in the cartoon. He quietly and efficiently served loyally, first under Megatron (even sending Ravage and the Insecticons to derail talks between the Autobots and Ronald Reagan at one point in the 1985 Transformers UK annual), then under Shockwave, attacking an aerospace construction plant whose facilities were used to build the Constructicons, who then built a massive radio dish that Soundwave used to beam a message back to Cybertron.

Continuing to operate under Shockwave, Soundwave then moved to serving Ratbat, and co-led the defense of Buenos Aires against the Underbase-empowered Starscream alongside Fortress Maximus, only to wind up deactivated by the villain.

Unlike many of the others deactivated by Starscream, Soundwave would appear again, under Scorponok's command. Throughout the U.S. comic, Soundwave was colored purple instead of his more trademark blue, and additionally was frequently drawn with a visible mouth.

Meanwhile, across the Atlantic in the UK, a sister title to the American series was also in production. It reprinted the American stories, but as it was released on a weekly (as opposed to monthly) schedule, it soon began to run out of material to reprint. It opted to create its own original stories at that point, which deftly weaved in and out of the ongoing American storyline. Under writer Simon Furman, Soundwave—coloured-blue was a fairly major player, portrayed in a manner much more consistent with his profile - that of a manipulator and blackmailer, reading others' minds and using their secrets to his own ends, always working towards his own goals.

When Megatron and Shockwave were both briefly believed deceased, he assumed leadership of the Decepticons during Optimus Prime's Crisis of Command and then the Dinobot Hunt story arcs, manipulating events to weaken the Autobot leadership and cause maximum casualties. When the two commanders returned and vied for leadership of the Decepticons, he turned the situation to his own advantage by working both sides of the field. He also enjoyed a rare victory in this period when he, Dirge and Kickback took over a NASA complex in an attempt to contact Cybertron with the facility's deep space radio equipment. The Autobots arrived, but a series of miscommunications between Prowl and Jetfire resulted in the transmission being sent, allowing the Decepticons to claim victory.

Towards the end of the UK series, a storyline began which separated from the regular ongoing American continuity, covering the exploits of the proactive Autobot Earthforce. In these stories, Soundwave sold Decepticon secrets to both the Autobots and Shockwave's group of Decepticons. Wildrider was blamed for this intelligence leak, and Soundwave silently allowed him to be killed rather than be discovered. After Starscream successfully removed Megatron and Shockwave from power, he and Soundwave entered into joint leadership of the Decepticons.

Issue #279 of the Marvel UK Transformers comic featured a story called "Divide and Conquor!" where Soundwave lead the bulk of the Decepticon forces on Earth against the Autobot Earthforce headquarters while Starscream attacked an oil tanker. Sent into battle by Prowl, the Dinobots routed the main Decepticon forces while Springer lead the Autobot Survivors, Broadside, Inferno, Skids, and Carnivac to defeat Starscream.

Soundwave attained leadership of the Decepticons in the future world of 2008, following the death of Shockwave (who had seized power when Galvatron traveled back in time). Soundwave led his era's Decepticons back to 1989 to participate in the Time Wars when the fabric of reality began to crumble, but as the conflict came to a head they fled back to their own time. Since it was later established that the damage done to the time stream may have resulted in their future being erased from the timeline, the final fate of the future Soundwave is unknown.

Soundwave returned to the pages of the US Transformers comic books for the relaunch of the series as Transformers: Generation 2. He participated in the Decepticon attack on Earth, and oversaw the reconstruction of the damaged Darkwing into a new, more powerful form.

Like many of the other Generation 1 Decepticons, Soundwave seemed to return to a command position on Megatron's return (killing Bludgeon in the process).

Soundwave made an appearance in the Decepticon forces under the command of Megatron in issue #7 of the Marvel Generation 2 comic series, in a story called "New Dawn." Megatron lead his Decepticons against Jhiaxus' second generation Cybertronians near the moon of Tykos. The Decepticons were defeated and Megatron left injured, presumed dead, but swearing revenge.

He was aboard the Warworld when Jhiaxus' forces attacked, but managed to evacuate. His fate within the Generation 2 comic series beyond this point is unknown.

Soundwave would also play a brief but important role in the text-only novel, Alignment, writer Simon Furman's take on what happened after the Transformers: Generation 2 comic series ended. He was the one who recovered Megatron's broken body after his duel with Galvatron. Subsequently, he was the ringleader of the conspirators (along with Ravage, Ramjet and Direwolf) who gave some of their spark energy to resurrect Megatron in a more powerful body, allowing him to defeat the forces of the Liege Maximo. After Megatron executes the Decepticon High Council save Shrapnel, Soundwave once again acted as Megatron's second in command and coordinated the strike against the Maximo with Ultra Magnus. His fate beyond this is unknown, save for a brief cameo in Beast Machines.

Soundwave as depicted in the Marvel Universe tends to be the most intellectual and philosophical of the Decepticons. He is appalled by the barbarity of Megatron and Shockwave battling in hand-to-hand combat for leadership of the Decepticons, especially as the entire spectacle is being broadcast on live television for human entertainment by Robo-Master. When the future Autobots and Decepticons join forces and repel an alien invasion of Cybertron he begins to propose a lasting truce to Ultra Magnus but stops himself, observing that too much has occurred between the 2 factions and their differences are irreconcilable.

TFcon comics
Soundwave appeared in the TFcon 2009 voice actor play Bee for, Bee now.

Other appearances
A parody of the Generation 1 Transformers was aired in the December 23, 2008 episode of Frank TV, called "Frank the Halls". In the story, Optimus Prime and his Autobots (Bumblebee, Jazz and Wheeljack) battle Megatron and his Decepticons (Soundwave and Starscream) when Optimus runs out of gas. Optimus becomes enraged at the price of gas, steals the fuel from the annoying hybrid Autobot Prius Maximus, then joins the Decepticons in destroying the city.

Soundwave appears in the Robot Chicken episode "Toy Meets Girl", voiced by Seth Green. He is portrayed as having retired from the Decepticon army and obtained honest employment as a transformable portable toilet. Frank Welker reprises his role of Soundwave (as well as Megatron but not Rumble) when he appears again in another Robot Chicken episode "Werewolf vs. Unicorn" where in the current years it's revealed that because the audio cassette tape and cassette players have long become obsolete and therefore no longer widely used, that his spy tactics now do not work (the people who discovered him in the skit were laughing at his mixtape which was Rumble being killed by them puling his tape out). He is later found by Megatron and Shockwave to be on sale on eBay with options to place a bid for 500 dollars or "Buy it now" for 1000 dollars, whereupon Shockwave exclaims "Request permission to buy it now!" The Commemorative Soundwave figure was used in "Werewolf vs. Unicorn".

Soundwave made a cameo appearance in the Family Guy episode "The Courtship of Stewie's Father" as Peter's new supervisor. In it, Soundwave releases a framed photograph from his cassette deck cavity, of himself and a human woman named Denise, who Soundwave proclaims is his wife, whom he met in a Christian chat room. Soundwave also appears in the Sealab 2021 episode "Hail, Squishface" as a toy on an Asian girl's cart, who sells Capt. Murphy Gloop, from the show The Herculoids.

A music video featuring Soundwave and a robot similar to Rumble and Frenzy named Lazer (though purely white in colour) breakdancing has surfaced throughout the Internet since 2000. The video contains audio clips from both the animated series and The Transformers: The Movie alongside music.

In 2007, shortly before the release of the live-action Transformers film, Soundwave appeared in the viral comedy short "Soundwave: The Touch."

Toys
 Generation 1 Soundwave (1984)
The original Soundwave toy (and his cassettes) began life as part of Takara's Micro Change line, designed by Satoshi Koizumi, featuring household objects that transformed into accurately-scaled robots. Incorporated into the Transformers toy line by Hasbro, the figure was packaged with Buzzsaw in the US, and with Rumble in Japan (also including a set of non-functional headphones). The tapes could fit into Soundwave's opening chest door (released by a push of his shoulder-mounted "eject" button), while the interaction level was maintained by his two guns, which turned into AA-sized batteries that could store in a compartment in his back. Cassette tapes that could interact with Soundwave were released regularly until 1988. The Soundwave toy was reissued in Japan in 2004, and in the U.S. in 2006 using the Soundblaster mold.
 Generation 1 Soundblaster (1987)
A re-mold of the Soundwave toy exclusive to Japan, Soundblaster is cast in black plastic where Soundwave was blue, with a retooled chest door, now made of translucent red plastic and able to hold two cassettes at once. Soundblaster came with a variant edition of Buzzsaw, who had a special sticker on his body that, when viewed through Soundblaster's door, would reveal the weak spots of Fortress Maximus. Soundblaster was reissued in Japan in 2005.
 Generation 1 Action Master Soundwave (1990)
The non-transforming Action Master incarnation of Soundwave came packaged with a transforming partner named Wingthing, who could become a gun for Soundwave to wield.
 Generation 2 Go-Bot Soundwave (1995)
The Marvel Comics Generation 2 series concluded before it could feature the Generation 2 toy line's new, distinctly different version of Soundwave from 1995 - a fluorescent yellow, blue and pink Ford Thunderbird stock car Go-Bot, a re-deco of an earlier figure named Gearhead. The figure was later recolored into W.A.R.S. for Transformers: Robots in Disguise.
 Generation 2 Laser Cycle Soundwave (unreleased)
Plans existed to repaint the Laser Cycle, Road Pig, into a version of Soundwave featuring his classic color scheme, but the figure was never released.
 Machine Wars Soundwave (1997)
1997's Machine Wars toy line, released exclusively in KB Toy stores, featured Soundwave as a repaint of the 1992 European and Canadian exclusive figure, Stalker. The toy transforms into a missile tank and, colored in shades of black, gray and maroon, resembled Soundwave only through a similar head sculpt, and a shoulder-mounted weapon, in this case, an electron rocket. His tech spec, however, was clearly based on that of the original Soundwave toy's, with an additional mention of a new nickname for this version of the character: "The Terror Tank."
 Transtech Soundwave (unreleased)
With the conclusion of the Beast Machines toy line, the initial plan for a follow-up was through the futuristic Transtech series. Although the idea was scrapped in favor of Transformers: Armada, Toronto-based design studio Draxhall Jump produced several designs for characters, including Soundwave.
 Smallest Transformers Soundwave with Jaguar (2003)
Part of the first wave of the Japan-only Smallest Transformers toy line. Despite the small size (roughly 2 inches in robot height), the toy is virtually faithful to the original G1 toy in design and transformation. Soundwave also comes with a micro cassette that transforms into Ravage.
In 2006, this toy was to be released with a redeco of Energon Megatron as a Target exclusive in the U.S., but plans to release the toy were canceled.
 Universe Soundwave with Space Case (2004)
A redeco of Soundwave's Machine Wars figure, this toy was rendered in shades of blue and yellow, and packaged with fellow Decepticon Space Case.
 Classics Commemorative Soundwave (2007)
A Toys "R" Us exclusive is said to be near identical to the original toy. This however has one difference from that of the 1984 figure, being that the chest compartment (tape deck door) has been re-molded to hold two cassette Transformers as opposed to one. This version of Soundwave is actually a 'reverse repaint' of the Japanese-exclusive Soundblaster, himself a retooling of the original Soundwave. Commemorative Soundwave includes both Ravage and Laserbeak, two cassettes seen prominently in the original series.
 Titanium 6 inch Soundwave with Laserbeak (2007)
Two versions of Generation 1 Soundwave were released in the Transformers: Titanium toy line. One was a 3-inch non-transforming version in robot mode. The other is a transformable 6-inch version that transforms into a cassette deck. Both Soundwave's feature die cast metal and plastic parts, and the 6-inch version also includes a transformable Laserbeak. It is also rumored that the larger version would be repainted and released as Soundblaster along with Ravage.
 Attacktix Soundwave (2007)
Series 2 of the Transformers Attacktix figures included a Generation 1 Soundwave figure.
 Music Label Soundwave (2007)
An MP3 player designed to look like the Generation 1 Soundwave figure. MiniSD cards fit inside his chest compartment, and comes with the shoulder gun, blaster, and alternate hands for holding the gun, making fists, and his "eject" finger. Uses 1 AAA battery. Despite the claim on the box, it can use at least up to a 2 GB memory card and play songs over 128kbit/s. In robot mode, he is the same size as Titanium Soundwave, though in "Cassette" mode he is longer and slightly taller. There are also headphones that are sold separately designed to look like Soundwave's minions Rumble and Frenzy.
Soundwave is available in three colors: Sonic White, Spark Blue (which closely resembles his original G1 incarnation) and Blaster Black (an homage to Soundblaster).
This figure was voted the 43rd top toy released in the last 10 years by ToyFare Magazine.
 Transformers Encore Reissue Soundwave (2007)
A release by Takara Tomy in Japan that is nearly identical to the original 1984 toy. Unlike the original 1984 release that was packaged with Buzzsaw, the Encore figure was packaged with Laserbeak.
 Mighty Muggs Soundwave (2008)
A Mighty Muggs doll of Soundwave with gun.
 Universe 25th Anniversary Soundwave (2009)
A San Diego Comic-Con International exclusive reissue of the original G1 Soundwave figure that comes with Buzzsaw, Laserbeak, Ravage and Ratbat.
 Classics Deluxe Soundwave (unreleased)
Although no new mold was released for Classics Soundwave (they instead reused the Takara Soundblaster mold), a design for a new Soundwave toy that turned into a SUV was considered. This design seems to have inspired Animated Soundwave.
 Masterpiece MP-13 Soundwave (2012)
An all-new mold of Soundwave in Takara Tomy's Masterpiece line. Comes packaged with Condor/Laserbeak, collapsible weapons that transform into batteries, a clear Energon cube that can attach to his chest, a detachable display grid, a forearm scanner attachment, a translucent pink cassette case and a new version of the Megatron gun originally offered in MP-01 Convoy/Optimus Prime. Aside from holding up to three newer Masterpiece cassette robots, Soundwave's chest can also accommodate the original G1 cassettes. Laserbeak in bird mode can peg on Soundwave's left shoulder or forearm.

Beast Wars

A character named Soundwave—but with no relation to the original character—was released as part of the Beast Wars Mutants sub-line in 2000. As a Mutant, this Soundwave transforms from bat to alligator, with no humanoid mode. Due to his in-built radar in bat mode, and crushing jaws in alligator mode, he excels at a variety of missions. However, due to his situation, Soundwave is a dark and bitter character. He has an ultra-sensitive internal radar in bat mode, and in alligator mode, his tail can send seismic shockwaves through the ground.

IDW Publishing
This version of Soundwave also appeared in IDW Publishing's Beast Wars: The Gathering miniseries. Activated on Earth by Magmatron and a group of Predacons from the future, Soundwave and the mutants emerged from their stasis pods and took up residence in a swamp that they quickly made their own. When a group newly activated Predacons led by Transquito ventured through the swamp on a mission they were attacked by the Mutants. Poison Bite attacked Retrax, Soundwave attacked Powerpinch and Icebird attacked Transquito. Deciding the swamp was not worth their lives, Scourge and Insecticon fled. However, in "The Ascending" it is revealed that Powerpinch, Transquito and Retrax survived.

IDW's Beast Wars Sourcebook series identifies the mutant Soundwave as a former warrior who may have been a veteran of the Great War, though the details are ambiguous at best. Sourcebook #4 states that Soundwave became an actor/entertainer after the ratification of the Pax Cybertronia, developing a "dramatic flair in everything from his movements to his speech paterns".

3H Enterprises

In Transformers: Universe - The Wreckers the Mutants traveled to Cybertron and sought the guidance of the Oracle computer, seeking a cure for their condition. What they did not know is that the Oracle was under the influence of the Quintessons. The Mutants were sent to the outer Orion Cluster. Once there they were captured by the Quintessons, found in contempt by the five-faced aliens, and destroyed in an attack by a swarm of Sharkticons.

Toys
 Beast Wars Deluxe Mutant Soundwave (2000)
Although the Beast Wars toy line had concluded in 1998, this sub-line was released during the Beast Machines era. Although the figures lack robot modes, they all feature vestigial robotic components—such as Soundwave's robot head, concealed within his bat mouth. A re-deco of the figure known as Leatherneck was intended for release in Transformers: Universe, but did not come to fruition.
This figure was based on drawings by Hasbro designer Tim Bradley.

Transformers: Cybertron

In Transformers: Cybertron, Soundwave's origins are greatly altered. While in the original G1 continuity, he was a native of Cybertron like Megatron and Starscream, this incarnation of Soundwave is the second Transformer from the mysterious Planet X. This is also the first incarnation to have an actual vehicle mode. He transforms into a Planet X Jet (bearing a resemblance to a stealth bomber) and is partnered with a smaller robot called Laserbeak (Killer Condor in Japan). In the English dub of this series, he has a synthesized voice, similar to his G1 counterpart. Unlike the Generation One Soundwave, he speaks like a modern disc jockey—using terms like "He got served" and "Peace out, bots" and calling the battlefield, "The Floor", giving him more of a personality than his normally emotionless G1 counterpart. This version of Soundwave is unique in comparison to any other incarnation, as while in most other continuities, outside of the Armada trilogy, Soundwave was Megatron's most loyal soldier, this Soundwave has no true loyalty towards the Decepticon leader.

The package bio for Soundwave mentions that Planet X itself may be a total deception, and that it is actually a term the agents use to refer to their service to Unicron. Although he and Sideways are the survivors of a dead civilization, they actually serve Unicron throughout space and time as his heralds in taking over new worlds to replace his loss of previous forms.

Soundwave is armed with two cannons, and can hide himself behind holograms when working in conjunction with Laserbeak.

Animated series
Soundwave first makes his appearance in the episode Titan, offering to lead Megatron and his minions to the planet Gigantion, however in a scene featuring Sideways and Starscream aboard the Atlantis a purple cassette player with the Decepticon symbol is on board playing music to ease the tension between the two evil robots. It is not clear if this is Soundwave or not, but it is interesting that he appeared in "Titan" just a few episodes later. In his first encounter with the Autobots he fought Optimus Prime and Wing Saber in their Sonic Wing mode and was able to hold his own in combat until Megatron was defeated by Metroplex and the Decepticons retreated.

Shortly after they arrived on Gigantion and there Megatron was upgraded into Galvatron, Soundwave abandoned the Decepticons, and joined up with his counterpart, Sideways. During a battle with the Autobot Cybertron Defense Team, he revealed the history of his world, and how they desired the Cyber Planet Keys to get revenge on the inhabitants of Gigantion.

Later, he and Sideways attempted to intervene in the epic battle between Galvatron and Starscream in order to claim the Planet Keys and Omega Lock, only to be sent into another universe by the distortion caused by the two fighters' conflict.

However, Soundwave would appear later, when Starscream reached out to Galvatron across dimensions, seemingly trapped along with him and Sideways. However, Starscream seemed to have returned by the series' end, while Soundwave and Sideways were shown to have found a dimension where Planet X still existed.

Soundwave is the only major transformer in the series who never summons his Cyber Key. In his toy version, his Cyber Key opens his chest compartment to store Laserbeak or one of his two cannons. In his first appearance to the Autobots, Soundwave demonstrates the ability to do this without the aid of a Cyber Key.

G1 Soundwave makes a cameo appearance in the animated series as a blue boombox that Sideways used to hear music.

Fun Publications
The Cybertron incarnation of Soundwave was among the characters to appear in the comic strip published exclusively through the Transformers Collectors Club, arriving on the planet itself to observe Vector Prime, Sentinel Maximus and Omega Prime after their defeat of Unicron's heralds, Nemesis Prime and Ramjet, and capture of the Dead Matrix. Dispatching Laserbeak to recover the Dead Matrix from its place in storage, Soundwave threw the talisman into the black hole that had been created by the collapse of Unicron, allowing the Chaos Bringer's Spark to escape and infiltrate the planet Yst, which he corrupted and transformed into his new body. Soundwave would link up with his master, and watch the unfolding carnage of a Mini-Con civil war. However, when Unicron chose that moment to attack, Soundwave was attacked by several Mini-Cons, including Scythe and Perceptor. Unable to hit the smaller Mini-Cons, Soundwave fled with Unicron when Primus awoke.

Toys
 Cybertron Voyager Soundwave (2005)
The first actual homage to the original Soundwave in modern times, the Cybertron toy transforms not into a tape deck, but a sleek alien stealth fighter. Beyond this, however, the nods to the original character are many, from his head design, his multi-barreled shoulder cannon to his opening chest door, activated by his Cyber Key. Soundwave comes with a new incarnation of Laserbeak, who transforms into a battery bomb that can store within Soundwave's chest compartment. This toy was recolored into Universe Blaster. This toy was based on an F-117 Nighthawk.
 Galaxy Force Voyager SoundblasterA black repaint of Soundwave, predictably named Soundblaster, was released exclusively in Japan through Takara's "Toy's Dream Project" series. However, this Soundblaster is a separate character from Soundwave.
 Cybertron Legends Soundwave (2006)
A Micro class Soundwave was released in the third wave of the Legends of Cybertron toy line. It came without Laserbeak. In 2007 a Target store exclusive value pack of four Voyager class Cybertron toy was released. It included Jetfire, Megatron, Optimus Prime and Soundwave. All identical to their original releases.

Transformers Cinematic Universe

Creation and development
Almost from the moment the live action Transformers movie was announced in 2007, producer Don Murphy and the production team made it clear they did not want to feature mass/size shifting in transformation (excluding the Allspark), due to concerns over realism. With this process an inherent part of Soundwave's tape deck alternate mode, there was some discussion over whether or not to change it due to its obsolescence, or to include the character in the film at all. It was announced by Hasbro at SDCC 2004 that movie Soundwave would be a helicopter. Early leaked movie scripts proposed that his alternate mode would be a helicopter, but animatics shown at the 2005 Comic Con were poorly received. This led to a rethink, with the eventual helicopter character rechristened as Vortex, then finally Blackout. 2006 script reviews named Soundwave as a spying boombox on Air Force One, able to transform into a small robot, but eventually, this character was amended to being Frenzy, with Don Murphy stating that Soundwave will be reserved for a future sequel, until they can "do him right". When the film was released on DVD a special on-line content from Best Buy showed early animation footage of Blackout as a blue helicopter with a head that resembled Soundwave.

In a USA Today online fan poll, Soundwave was one of the 10 Transformers that the fans wanted in the sequel, winning with 20% of the votes.

Soundwave appears in Transformers: Revenge of the Fallen. Soundwave is a satellite in the film. Soundwave is not seen in his robot form in the film. Frank Welker reprised his voicing role, and used his Doctor Claw voice from Inspector Gadget, which, when run through a vocoder, gives Soundwave his unique voice from the original animated series. The lack of this vocoder in the 2009 film left the voice sounding more like Doctor Claw than the original Soundwave. He has his minion Ravage to do his bidding in the film.

Soundwave also appears in Transformers: Dark of the Moon, this time transforming into a Mercedes-Benz SLS AMG and with Laserbeak to serve him. Soundwave is armed with sonic cannons.

His Hasbro Battle Bio states that he is 22 feet tall and that his main weapons are sonic cannons which can only be used in the atmosphere, as sound waves will not travel in vacuum.

Soundwave also makes a brief appearance in the movie Bumblebee. His appearance closely matches his G1 counterpart and appears alongside Shockwave and Starscream (a non-speaking role for the latter). He is voiced by Jon Bailey, who also voices Shockwave in the film. Unlike previous films, Bailey's voice is run through a vocoder to bring back Soundwave's signature voice.

Films
In Revenge of the Fallen, Soundwave is only seen in his Cybertronian satellite mode, hovering above Earth in orbit. Like his original counterpart, he functions as a Decepticon espionage agent and communications officer. In the film, he receives a message from Wheelie on Mikaela Banes possessing a shard of the Allspark and orders him to retrieve it. Soundwave would later hack into a human satellite and discover the location of another Allspark shard, deploying his servant Ravage to retrieve it. Following the death of Optimus Prime, Soundwave would carry out Megatron's orders to prepare the Decepticons for an invasion of Earth. Soundwave would later locate Sam Witwicky's parents in Paris, France. Ravage was later killed by Bumblebee.
Frank Welker returned to reprise his role as Soundwave in this movie, and the film following after. but unlike his G1 counterpart, his voice was not vocoded, which the character was well known for.

In Dark of the Moon, Soundwave was retconned into having been on Earth since the 1970s. He discovered the Autobot spaceship, the Ark on the Moon, and forcibly recruited various human servants from the U.S. and Russian space agencies to prevent further exploration of it following the initial Moon landings, while he ordered an army of Decepticons to steal most of the pillars onboard and hide under the moon's surface. In the modern day he appears at Megatron's base in Africa, where he and Laserbeak report the Autobot's recovery of Sentinel Prime and the remaining pillars from the crashed Ark. Megatron praises Soundwave's initiative in the decades-long plan and orders Laserbeak to kill their human allies. The only human ally they don't kill, Dylan Gould, has Soundwave disguise himself as a Mercedes-Benz SLS AMG that belonged to Sam's girlfriend, Carly, in order to get close to the Autobots. He reveals himself and captures Carly once the two humans learn of Gould's alliance with the Decepticons, and threatens her in order to convince Sam to discover the Autobot's plans. During the battle in Chicago, Soundwave and Barricade lead several Decepticons in capturing some of the Autobots. Gould convinces Soundwave not to take prisoners, and Soundwave orders the others to execute their "trophies". Once Que is dead, Soundwave prepares to kill Bumblebee himself, but a Decepticon battle-cruiser hijacked by Wheelie and Brains drops fighters near Soundwave, distracting him and allowing the Autobots to fight back. Bumblebee attacks Soundwave who tries to shoot him, but is confused among the crushing ships and shoots the other Decepticons. He throws Bumblebee, but Bumblebee then slays Soundwave by sticking his cannon into Soundwave's chest and shooting upwards. This causes Soundwave's head to disintegrate, killing him instantly.

In Bumblebee, Soundwave is seen on Cybertron along with Shockwave and Starscream commanding the Decepticons in the war against the Autobots. He apparently manages to capture Optimus Prime with the help of a small army and Ravage and then Prime escapes from them.

Other media

Comic books
In issue #4 of Transformers: Defiance, it is revealed that the reason for Soundwave to have believed to have been dead is because he was on the Decepticons ship that The Fallen was commanding, and that all of its crew were missing by the time Megatron noticed the emergency signal emitting from the ship while he was chasing the Allspark.

Soundwave first appeared in issue #2 of Transformers: Alliance where he arrived at the crash site of the Nemesis on Mars. There he found Dreadwing's head, as well as the body of Frenzy, then contacted Starscream and told him to rally to his signal. Starscream was surprised to hear from Soundwave, as he had been believed dead for years. Soundwave deployed a number of his forces on Earth, leaving others on his ship.

In Tales of the Fallen #5 Soundwave, still in orbit after the events of the 2009 film, notices someone has reactivated Ravage.

Soundwave appears in Transformers: Nefarious #1, set months after the events of the 2009 film. Bumblebee, Breakaway, Jolt, Knock Out and Dune Runner are sent to investigate spark fragments detected at Kingdom Petrochemicals. Arriving first Breakaway is warned by Soundwave to leave, but unwilling to give in the Autobot is swiftly defeated. Bumblebee and his team fire on Soundwave, who escapes. In "Nefarious" #2, Soundwave sent Dirt Boss, Reverb, and Brakedown to Wendover, Utah to find an "Initiative" facility. Soundwave then contacted Ravage in order to discover how he was resurrected. Then, he proceeded to assist Reverb, Dirt Boss, and Brakedown, in a fight with the Autobots. After a battle with Optimus Prime, Soundwave convinces the Autobot leader to join forces temporarily, in order to find "the Initiative".

Novels
In the Transformers: Revenge of the Fallen coloring book, Soundwave is depicted hacking into a military satellite.

Television
In Cyber Missions #1, Soundwave successfully infiltrates the NEST command base (in his satellite mode, oddly), which is guarded by Bumblebee. Soundwave transforms and smashes the screen projecting Optimus Prime and engages the Autobot. Bumblebee fires a shot, but Soundwave sends it back to Bumblebee as a sonic boom. Bumblebee then fires several more rounds with Soundwave frantically trying to absorb all the bullets, but is finally blown backwards. In Cyber Missions #2, Bumblebee trapped Soundwave in a vacuum-sealed electromagnetic bubble, rendering his abilities useless.

Video games
Like the movie, Soundwave coordinates the mission to the playable Decepticon. His voice is now a similar Vocoder fashion of his G1 counterpart.

In Dark of the Moon, Soundwave is a playable character. He is ordered by Megatron to destroy a Sector 7 nest base that contains information about Sentinel Prime. Soundwave is among the Decepticons that greet Shockwave at the end of the game in South Africa. He shows Shockwave a 3D hologram of Chernobly and the artifact he must recover. He transforms into a Modified white SUV similar to a Cadillac SRX

In the Nintendo DS game Revenge of the Fallen: Decepticons, Grindor, Sideways, Soundwave and Starscream greet a new Decepticon protoform and send him on a mission. Soundwave directs the new protoform to survive on Earth.

In the downloadable content pack for the Xbox 360 and PS3, Soundwave is confirmed to be a playable character. He is probably based on the Deluxe toy.

In Transformers: Dark of the Moon: Stealth Force Edition for the Wii and 3DS Soundwave is a playable character, and (like with the PS3/360 version) transforms into a heavily modified Cadillac SRX

In Transformers: War for Cybertron, Soundwave is a playable character taking the alternate form of a cybertronian truck. He is playable in levels 3, 4 and 5 of the decepticon campaign and is a boss that players have to fight in the autobot level 2. Like all characters within the game, he is playable in escalation mode, and players have to have their decepticon leader look like him in multiplayer mode. In the game his default weapon is a neutron assault rifle, although he does have an energon repair ray in level 5 of the decepticon campaign.

Toys
 Revenge of the Fallen Deluxe Soundwave (2009)
A Triple Changer that transforms from Cybertronian battleship to satellite and robot.
The toy stands 12.5 centimeters tall in robot mode.
 Revenge of the Fallen Deluxe Soundwave G1 redeco (2009)
A redeco of Soundwave in blue and gray, resembling his G1 colors. Bundled with Voyager The Fallen and Voyager Megatron (2007 version) in the Toys "R" Us exclusive Gathering at the Nemesis gift set.
 Revenge of the Fallen RPMs Soundwave (2009)
A non-transformable diecast car the size of Hot Wheels or Matchbox cars. This Scion xB-derived vehicle depicts Soundwave's alternate Earth mode, based on that of his Transformers Animated incarnation. An illustration of his robot mode is molded on the undercarriage.
 Revenge of the Fallen Legends Soundwave (2010)
A new Legends mold of Soundwave, which transforms into a satellite.
 Revenge of the Fallen Deluxe Black Soundwave (unreleased)
A Chara Hobby exclusive in Japan, this figure is a black redeco of Soundwave.
 Revenge of the Fallen Deluxe N.E.S.T Infiltration Soundwave (2010)
A blue and red redeco of the original Deluxe Soundwave from the film. Will be included in a N.E.S.T. Battle two-pack with a redecorated Bumblebee sporting a N.E.S.T. symbol on the driver and passenger side doors.
 Transformers Speed Stars Soundwave (2010)
A reissue of the RPMs Soundwave diecast car.
 Transformers Speed Stars Stealth Force Soundwave (2010)
A non-transforming Scion xB (designed similarly to the Speed Stars diecast car) that mechanically opens its panels and reveals hidden weapons at the slide of the roof.
 Dark of the Moon Burger King Flip Out Soundwave (2011)
A BK Kids meal toy available at Burger King restaurants in the U.S. The toy consists of a detailed head that opens to reveal a small robot body, giving the overall figure a Bobblehead look. It also has parts that glow in the dark.
 Dark of the Moon Cyberverse Legion Bumblebee vs. Soundwave (2011)
A Walmart exclusive Legion (formerly Legends) set featuring a gold redeco of Bumblebee and a purple redeco of Soundwave - both originally released in the Revenge of the Fallen line. Also included in this set is an orange redeco of Universe Legends Rodimus.
 Dark of the Moon Mech Tech Deluxe Class Soundwave (2011 in Japan, Cancelled for the Hasbro version, 2011 in Asia)
An all-new Deluxe mold of Soundwave, which transforms into a Mercedes-Benz SLS AMG. Includes Mech Tech weapon and satellite dish. It is told that the toy has been cancelled along with Target's Leadfoot, Human Alliance Soundwave and Deluxe Wheeljack in the states. It could be unknown if it is actually released or not. This toy was cancelled due to retailers such as Walmart, Target, etc. wanted Hasbro's new Transformers Prime toy line, so they stopped doing these figures. It was cancelled along with Deluxe Leadfoot, Deluxe Wheeljack, and Human Alliance Soundwave, in the Asian market, Soundwave saw release in deluxe form.
 Dark of the Moon Mech Tech Deluxe Class Soundblaster Soundwave (TakaraTomy, 2012)
A black redeco of Deluxe Soundwave as an homage to Soundblaster from the Japanese G1 prequel toy line, Diaclone. Only in Japan with white Wheeljack, small stripes Bumblebee and white with red Ratchet.
 Dark of the Moon Human Alliance Soundwave with Laserbeak and Mr. Gould (2011 in Japan, later 2012 in the states)
A new Human Alliance figure of Soundwave with Laserbeak and a 2-inch Dylan Gould driver figure. Soundwave's license plate reads, "SUPERIOR" - a reference to his catch phrase, "Soundwave superior," from The Transformers: The Movie. Laserbeak transforms into a blaster with a mounting point for any human figure. As with the Deluxe figure, this figure is officially licensed from Mercedes-Benz. It has also been canceled with the Deluxe figure mentioned above and the other two Autobots.FullMetalHero.com - Dark of the Moon Soundwave Gets 3 Toys; Human Alliance Confirmed with Laserbeak 

 Dark of the Moon Cyberverse Legion Class Soundwave (2011)
A brand new Legion mold of Soundwave that transforms into a Mercedes-Benz SLS AMG.Transformers Cyberverse Legion Soundwave (2012)This toy is sold along with the Transformers Prime Cyberverse figures.Age of Extinction Movie Advanced Series Deluxe Soundwave (2014)This toy is black/gray redeco of Dark of the Moon MechTech Soundwave, was renamed Darkside Soundwave. Darkside Soundwave transforms from a fully licensed Mercedes-Benz SLS AMG into a robot.Movie The Best Human Alliance Soundwave (2017)Released by Takara Tomy to conclude the 10th anniversary of the live-action film series, this Soundwave is an extensive redeco of his Human Alliance toy, without the Laserbeak and the Mr. Gould figure.The Last Knight Tiny Turbo Changer Soundwave (2017)Released in Series 1 of Tiny Turbo Changers, Soundwave changes from robot based on his appearance in Dark of the Moon to a sports car of fictitious origin. He features articulation at his shoulders and waist and his hands are compatible with Cyberverse weapons and other small accessories. Blind-Bags stamped with the letter 'H' contain Soundwave figures.

Transformers Animated

Transformers Animated Soundwave has a completely different origin story from most other versions of Soundwave. Starting off as an Earth-based robot toy, he became sentient after exposure to the Allspark. Whilst his robot mode still retains elements of his original tapedeck incarnation, more so in his toy form, his alt-mode is now a loudspeaker-equipped Scion xB. He also possesses two supporters: Laserbeak, who transforms into an electric guitar he uses for a sonic boom attack, and Ratbat, which becomes a keytar for use in sonic hypnosis. His voice, now provided by Jeff Bennett in the United States and Nobuo Tobita in Japan, once again requires a vocoder to create Soundwave's trademark robotic monotone voice.

Animated series
Soundwave was originally a simple robotic toy that Sari got for her birthday, built by Megatron as a part of a plan to take advantage of Sari's careless and repeated use of her Allspark key to continuously upgrade the toy until it serves as a suitable body for Megatron to host. However, the excessive usage of the key to enhance Soundwave caused an unexpected side-effect: Developing almost Cybertronian sophistication at an alarmingly increasing rate to the point of becoming self-aware to the point where he refuses to take orders from Sari (or any other human) anymore. It was by observing the common labor-robots in the city that he concluded that not only robots are superior to humans in every way, but that it's illogical that robots are forced to succumb to their human masters, and it should be the other way around. By then, Megatron introduced himself to Soundwave through televisions in a nearby electronics store as his creator "of sorts" to impose unto him his plan to crush the Autobots. At first, Soundwave declared this illogical to fight robot-kind until Megatron insisted that they were traitors that upheld the human race's slavery of all robot-kind, convincing Soundwave to ultimately side with the Decepticons with the intent to overthrow all humans and obliterate the robots that protect them. He used his technology-manipulating speakers to summon all nearby labor-robots to convert them into his new Transformer body while using his stereo-system to spark a robot-revolution against their "human-oppressors." All automated forms of public transportation stopped, and the city's labor robots jumped the Autobots when they appeared on the scene. After failing to convince Bulkhead into joining him and killing Sari in the name of all robot-kind, it appeared that Bulkhead destroyed Soundwave with a single blow of his powerful wrecking-ball arm, shattering his body into hundreds of pieces. However, unknown to the Autobot, his core survived, in the form of a small, almost-invisible media player.

Soundwave regenerated at Christmas time as ex-Sumdac Systems Vice President Porter C. Powell, who had acquired Soundwave's original patents while he was in charge of the company, was distributing multiple Soundwave toys during the Christmas season. Soundwave managed to reprogram some of the toys, using one of them to spike the Autobots' oil nog. With the Autobots now sedated and out of commission, Soundwave proceeded to take them to the basement where he attempted to brainwash them into taking on his ideology as Decepticons by placing them in a virtual program in human form. However, the plan was briefly halted by the attempted intervention of Sari as well as the Autobots learning the truth of where they are. Soundwave had a backup plan, using Laserbeak to force Sari into a retreat, then using Ratbat in keytar mode to complete the Autobots' reformat. Soundwave succeeded in placing the Autobots under his control, and used the numerous toy replicas of himself to take control of the humans in Detroit. However, since Sari was techno-organic, she was immune to the mind-control waves. Soundwave was defeated when Sari recruited the help of Scrapper, Snarl and Wreck-Gar to fight the brainwashed Autobots, and was smashed apart along with Ratbat by Optimus using Laserbeak's guitar mode as a makeshift axe. Though Soundwave's core still remained intact, it was eventually turned off by Sari before being rescued by Laserbeak. It is unknown what became of Soundwave after that.

Toys
 Animated Deluxe Soundwave with Laserbeak (2008)
A Deluxe sized figure that transforms into a Scion xB-like vehicle. Soundwave's bio describes his alternate mode as an SUV, although the Scion xB is actually a station wagon that resembles a small minivan. Its most notable feature is that one of his "minions", Laserbeak, is present in the form of a Flying V-style electric guitar that transforms into a bird. It can also be attached to the top of his vehicle mode or held like a guitar in robot mode. His upper torso has the look of an old cassette player door, set up as a nod to his G1 toy.
 Animated Deluxe Electrostatic Soundwave with Ratbat (2009)
A gray/red redeco of Soundwave, which resembles G1 Soundblaster. Ratbat comes with this figure and transforms into a keytar.
 Animated Activators Soundwave (2009)
A Scout-sized figure with near-instant transformation at the push of a button.
 Animated TA-16 Deluxe Soundwave (Takara Tomy) (2010)
The 2010 Japan release version of Deluxe Soundwave by Takara Tomy sports a metallic dark blue finish, as opposed to the matte finish of the Hasbro version.. Also bundled with TA-03 Voyager Ironhide (Bulkhead).
 Animated TA-25 Activators Soundblaster (Takara Tomy) (2010)
A gray/red redeco of Activators Soundwave. Available only in Japan.
 Animated TA-47 Deluxe Electrostatic Soundwave (Takara Tomy) (2010)
The Japan release version of Electrostatic Soundwave.

Transformers: Timelines (Shattered Glass)

This Soundwave is an alternate good version of the Generation 1 character from the BotCon exclusive "Shattered Glass" comic, in which the Decepticons are on the side of good and the Autobots on the side of evil. His appearance is based on the white music label Soundwave MP3 player, while Buzzsaw seems to be based on Steeljaw in appearance.

Fun Publications
Soundwave first appears as a member of Megatron's forces in the Transformers: Timelines story "Shattered Glass" story by Fun Publications. He helps in the attack on the Autobots' Ark launching platform, working with Buzzsaw.

Soundwave makes a cameo in the fiction "Dungeons & Dinobots", a text-based story. When the Autobots are gaining the advantage in an attack on the Arch-Ayr fuel dump he calls in the Mayhem Suppression Squad to help the Decepticons.

Soundwave appears in the story "Do Over". He is among the crew of the Nemesis, which follows the Autobots' Ark to Earth. When the ship is damaged in battle with the Ark, he escapes in a stasis pod to Earth.

Soundwave is spotlighted in the story The Desert Heat!. In this story, having crashed to Earth in an escape pod, Heatwave recovers Soundwave and helps his fellow Decepticon get back online and assume an Earth-style alternate mode.

Soundwave appears in the story Eye in the Sky. Cliffjumper, Crasher, Frenzy, Heatwave, Ravage and Soundwave are sent on a mission to Burpleson Air Force Base to stop the Autobots from controlling the GODS defense system. Heatwave uses his powers to convince the GODS transmitter to fire the weapon on itself and stop the Autobots from taking control.

Soundwave is spotlighted in the story Blitzwing Bop. The Elite Guardsman Thunderwing intercepts a radio signal from Earth which mentions Soundwave. Finding Soundwave is wanted for a minor offense from long ago he heads to Earth. Thunderwing finds Soundwave involved in a battle the Autobot Blaster for the possession of the malfunctioning Decepticon Blitzwing. Although not interested in the dispute, Soundwave convinces Thunderwing that Soundwave cannot leave Earth for trial on Cybertron until his commanding officer can be notified, and the only way to get Starscream online is to rescue Blitzwing. Thunderwing is still unwilling to takes sides in the battle against Blaster, merely following the Decepticon, but Soundwave tricks Blaster into mentioning a crime he committed on Cybertron while Thunderwing is in nearby. Thunderwing immediately goes into arrest mode and tries to capture Blaster, but Blaster escapes in a malfunctioning Stellar Spanner. With Starscream back online Soundwave confesses to his minor crimes and Thunderwing passes a sentence of community service on him.

Toys
An official toy exists, as part of the SG Blaster Vs SG Soundwave box-set, and is a repaint of the G1 Soundblaster toy (itself, a retool of the G1 Soundwave toy). In addition, the white Music Label Soundwave figure matches his colors almost exactly, save for the Decepticon symbol on his chest, and has been officially repurposed as one of this character's forms.

 Timelines Deluxe Shattered Glass Soundwave (2012)
A BotCon 2012 exclusive white and blue redeco of the Universe/Classics 2.0 Deluxe Ironhide/Ratchet figure with a new head sculpt. The van's side panels are decorated with "Cold Slither" logos as a nod to the G.I. Joe episode of the same name.

Transformers Aligned Continuity

Soundwave was a gladiator around the same time as Megatron. He has many pet Mini-Cons who work for him, particularly Laserbeak.

Transformers: Prime
Soundwave is one of the main antagonists in the 2011 computer animated series Transformers: Prime. Unlike his previous incarnations, Soundwave rarely speaks, instead recording archive audio and videos from other sources and repeats it when needed, displaying it on his face, which is composed entirely of an electronic screen. This was because Duane Capizzi, the producer of the show, wanted Soundwave to contrast with the talkative Starscream. Due to his silent persona, the show's staff compared him to Star Wars' Boba Fett. He is armed with two cables that extend from his chest that have an electrical appendage on each end that have a variety of uses, and can create portals to transport objects. He is rarely seen in combat, spending most of his time supporting the Decepticons as a communications officer and technical specialist. However, he is shown to be a proficient fighter when circumstances need it.

Soundwave speaks only once in the episode "Minus One", mocking the Autobots before going offline ("Soundwave: superior, Autobots: inferior"). Once again, his voice was modulated like his G1 counterpart, albeit less enhanced. Frank Welker reprises his role as Soundwave for that episode.

In the Darkness Rising 5 part mini-series, Soundwave detects the presence of Arcee, so Starscream sends a pair of Decepticons to attack her. Later, Soundwave detects a signal from deep space, which he is certain is Megatron, so the Space Bridge is opened, and Megatron returns. Later, Soundwave deploys Laserbeak at Starscream's orders to capture Fowler in order to locate the Autobot base. He is later assigned to hijack an Earth bond radio telescope array to location of Cybertron, as part Megatron's plan to use their Space Bridge to transport Dark Energon to Cybertron. However, the Autobots' young human allies figure out the Decepticons have hijacked the array and go to the array to shut it down. The young computer wiz Raf hacks into the array computer system, and Soundwave attacks them. He cuts the array's main line locking the dishes in place. While preparing to leave, the Autobots human ally Miko takes a picture of Soundwave with her cell phone, Soundwave responds to this by taking a picture of Jack, Miko, and Raf (possibly with the intention of passing it along with information of their connection with the Autobots onto his fellow Decepticons).

Soundwave is well aware of Starscream's treachery against Megatron, and on several occasions saved Megatron from his treacherous lieutenant. In "Masters & Students", Soundwave sent Laserbeak to make sure that Starscream retrieved the incapacitated Megatron from the Space Bridge wreckage while he witnesses Optimus' battle with Skyquake. In "Sick Mind" when Starscream and Knock Out conspire to euthanize the comatose Megatron, Soundwave at first appears to consider agreeing with the two, but points out the cord of Bumblebee's cortical psychic patch Bumblebee is hooked up to, and orders Megatron be put back online so that he will not have fallen by an Autobot's hand.

In "Rock Bottom" Megatron reveals he is aware of Starscream's ongoing treachery due to Soundwave having constant surveillance on the traitor and relaying his attempts of usurping him.

In "One Shall Rise" Pt. 3, Airachnid is placed in temporary command of the Decepticons when Megatron leaves to aid Optimus in defeating Unicron. In an attempt to secure her power for good, and to escape Unicron's wrath, Airachnid suggests that the Decepticons leave Megatron to continue their efforts on another world. Soundwave, being eternally loyal to Megatron, vetoed her orders and displayed unexpected combat skills to secure the ship for when Megatron returned. It is implied that, although Megatron is made aware of Airachnid's attempted grab for power, he does not punish her until Soundwave reminds him of her treachery in the season 2 episode "Crossfire".

In "Orion Pax" Pt. 1, Megatron orders Soundwave to remove Arcee from the ship after she broke in to try to rescue Optimus Prime. Soundwave manages to open a ground bridge to bridge her off, right before Orion saw her.

In "Triage", Soundwave hunts for an ancient Cybertronian relic. Having lost his minion Laserbeak, he continues the search on his own, fighting Wheeljack to claim the relic, the Resonance Blaster and defeat Wheeljack before he reclaims Laserbeak. He returns to the Nemesis with Megatron's prize, and is highly praised for it by Megatron, putting Knock Out and Dreadwing to shame who lost their relics to Arcee, Bumblebee and Starscream.

In "Hard Knocks", Soundwave captured Smokescreen and brought him on board the Nemesis after the Decepticons learned that Smokescreen was a clue to finding the final Omega Key.

In "Regeneration" and "Darkest Hour", Soundwave, along with Starscream and Knock Out, captured the children and held them for ransom unless the Autobots gave the Omega Keys to the Decepticons. However, when Optimus Prime destroyed the Omega Lock (and the Keys with them), Soundwave retreated back to the Nemesis with the other Decepticons.

In "Darkmount, NV", when Jack and Arcee were spotted in Jasper following the destruction of the Autobot base, Soundwave sent Laserbeak, along with two Vehicons, to terminate them. However, after Laserbeak was destroyed, Soundwave was unable to retrieve any surveillance footage from his remains.

In "Scattered" and "Prey", Soundwave was present when Shockwave presented Predaking to Megatron.

In "Rebellion", when Starscream sent out members of his armada to investigate a number of Autobot signals, Soundwave pointed out to him that their army was thinly spread and suggested that the Autobots were using the Harbinger as a base of operations. He later retreated with the other Decepticons as Darkmount was destroyed by Optimus Prime, aided by Agent Fowler and several Air Force pilots.

In "Thirst", he oversees the destruction of the mutant Terrorcons and is confronted by a newly freed Airachnid, who regained control of her Insecticons. When she charges him, he opens a space bridge to one of Cybertron's moons stranding her and her minions.

In "Minus One", Soundwave is taken captive by the Autobots and questioned for information regarding Megatron's motives. However, Soundwave erases all the data of Megatron's plans before Optimus gives Ratchet approval to crack him open. The normally mute Decepticon then taunts the Autobots in his own voice before deactivating. Later, Laserbeak attacks the Autobot base and hooks up with Soundwave, reactivating him and giving him a new copy of Megatron's plans. He then proceeds to incapacitate Bulkhead and Smokescreen before kidnapping Ratchet and bringing him to the Nemesis.

In "Deadlock", Soundwave fights Jack and Miko (who is in the Apex armor) on the bridge of the Nemesis. With help from Raf, Jack and Miko trap Soundwave in the Shadowzone.

Transformers: Robots in Disguise
Soundwave returns from the Shadowzone in the tenth episode of the second season of the sequel series Transformers: Robots in Disguise. He escapes, trapping Bumblebee in the Shadowzone. Then, he quickly immobilizes most of the Autobots before getting tricked by Fixit and the humans into letting Bumblebee back in. The Autobots corner Soundwave and throw him back into the Shadowzone.
However, he returns in the final season, as a major antagonist with a new body. In "Collateral Damage", he tries to return Megatron from his exile, but his plan failed when he was defeated by Bumblebee and his team along with Optimus Prime who was upgraded with Hi-Test.

Frank Welker reprises his role once again, with his voice more closely resembling his G1 counterpart than in Transformers: Prime.

Books
Soundwave appears in the novel Transformers: Exodus. He was one of Megatronus' opponents and nearly defeated him, however this instead brought respect between the two. Soundwave commanded the Mini-Cons Ravage, Rumble, Frenzy, and Laserbeak, and joined Megatron as one of the Decepticons.

Soundwave appears in the short story "Bumblebee at Tyger Pax" by Alex Irvine.

Soundwave appears in the novels Transformers: Exiles and Transformers: Retribution.

Video games
Transformers: War for Cybertron

A playable character in the last three chapters of the Decepticon campaign. While Shockwave is established as Megatron's second-in-command, Soundwave is shown acting as Megatron's right hand during the campaign in Shockwave's absence.

Soundwave assists Megatron and Breakdown into infiltrating Iacon, defeating Zeta Prime, and hunting down Omega Supreme. He is also a boss in the Autobot campaign, being the warden of Kaon Prison in the Decepticons' capital city and using his tape cassettes Frenzy, Rumble and Laserbeak to attack. The Autobots manage to defeat him, but not before he delivers a fatal blow to Zeta Prime, absorbing what remained of his life force energy in order to regenerate his own strength, and then manages to escape before Optimus can finish him.

Aside from transforming into a Cybertronian truck, Soundwave can also turn into a boombox, as shown right before his boss battle, in the game's ending credits and a GameStop promotional commercial for the game featuring Shockwave. In this mode, he plays the Stan Bush songs "The Touch" and "Till All Are One".

Transformers: Fall of Cybertron

In this sequel to Transformers: War for Cybertron, Soundwave is playable in two levels. The first time is in Chapter 9 in which he rebuilds Megatron after he was destroyed by Metroplex. The other level is the final one in which Soundwave boards the Ark and helps destroy the Ark's defenses. Rumble and Laserbeak assist Soundwave in these tasks. He pops up throughout the rest of the game as an NPC.

Toys
 Generations Deluxe Cybertronian Soundwave (2010)
A new mold, based on his appearance on War for Cybertron.

 United UN05 Deluxe Soundwave Cybertron Mode (2010)
The Japanese version of the Generations figure by Takara Tomy is in a metallic repaint.

 Prime Cyberverse Legion Soundwave (2012)
 Prime Robots in Disguise Revealers Deluxe Soundwave with Laserbeak (2012)
A new Deluxe mold of Soundwave, which transforms into a UAV. A piece of his chest separates to form Laserbeak, which can mount on either of his hands.

 Prime: Beast Hunters Deluxe Soundwave & Ravage w/ Thunder Talon (2013)
A retooled and a repaint of the Deluxe Robots in Disguise Soundwave. Soundwave comes with a new chest piece which can transform into Ravage and comes with a Talon Grapple Gun.

 Prime: Beast Hunters Cyberverse Legion Soundwave w/ Sonic Saw''' (2013)

Transformers: Cyberverse

Soundwave appears in Transformers: Cyberverse'', appearing sporadically in season one and becoming a primary villain starting in season two, though he enters a much more heroic role in season three and four. More brutish and petty than previously incarnations, he is often shown playing fitting music for whatever situation is at hand on his speakers, annoying both Autobots and Decepticons alike.

Soundwave is first seen in the animated series in season one during a memory of Bumblebee's at Maccadam's Old Oil House, where he impresses some of the other patrons with his dancing skills. During season two, he butts heads with fellow Decepticon Shockwave, such as taking the opportunity to mock Shockwave when he gets chastised for "making excuses" by Megatron. During the first half of season three, Soundwave is one of the few Cybertronians freed from the Quintessons' time loop, where he learns to work alongside the Autobot Hot Rod to mount a campaign of resistance against them, and eventually becomes Hot Rod's friend. However, as a result of being forcibly pulled out of the time loop, Soundwave occasionally freezes up. The two eventually learn about the Quintesson Scientist and go to confront him. The Scientist reveals that he keeps Soundwaves from universes that the Quintessons have judged "guilty" and destroyed as "souvenirs", much to Soundwave's disgust. After he freezes up again, the Scientist fixes him, and Soundwave "thanks" the Scientist by attacking him before releasing Laserbeak to help the other Cybertronians free all the Autobots and Decepticons from the loop. Soundwave and Hot Rod attempt to rally the bickering Autobots and Decepticons, though when this doesn't work Soundwave releases a sonic blast to pacify everyone, before ordering them to train against the Quintesson forces. Soundwave plays a major role during the second half of season four, helping his fellow Cybertronians fight Tarn's brainwashed Perfect Decepticons. During the ensuing chaos, he manages to seize the Cortex Helm from Tarn and uses it to free the Perfect Decepticons, ultimately sacrificing himself to annihilate both Tarn and the helm. Hot Rod holds a memorial for his fallen friend after the battle, which both Autobots and Decepticons attend as Cybertron finally enters a new age of peace.

References

All articles with unsourced statements
Villains in animated television series
Audio storage
Comics characters introduced in 1984
Computer storage tape media
Fictional bats
Fictional characters who can manipulate sound
Fictional crocodilians
Fictional henchmen
Fictional lieutenants
Fictional mutants
Fictional secret agents and spies
Fictional telepaths
Male characters in animated series
Male film villains
Tape recording
Transformers characters
Video game bosses
Fictional mute characters